Sharks' Treasure is a 1975 American adventure film written, produced and directed by Cornel Wilde and starring Cornel Wilde and Yaphet Kotto.

Plot
Eccentric charter skipper Jim Carnahan (Cornel Wilde) and his team of hard-luck dreamers battle sharks, bandits and their own greed to recover sunken treasure off the coast of Honduras.

Cast
 Cornel Wilde as Jim Carnahan
 Yaphet Kotto as Ben Flynn
 John Neilson as Ron
 Cliff Osmond as Lobo
 David Canary as Larry
 David Gilliam as Juanito

Production
Wilde says he came up with the idea for the film in 1969 but could not raise the finance until Jaws. "I would rather have had the field to ourselves, without Jaws," he said.

He called the film "a very down to earth treasure hunting story of today... It shows guys who get hooked on to a real find, hock everything they have, give up jobs... The characters and incidents are based on a lot of true accounts."

Much of the film was shot near Bonaire in the Dutch Antilles.

"It was the most dangerous picture I've ever worked on," said Wilde. "Working 70 feet underwater, surrounded by sharks, you're pressured by all sorts of possible hazards... but I was much more excited than I was afraid."

Reception
The Los Angeles Times called the film "crude, violent, energetic and usual."

After seven weeks of release in three major markets in the United States, including California and Florida, the film had grossed $2 million.

"Money, Money"
The opening theme song "Money, Money" was written by Wilde (under the pseudonym Jefferson Pascal) and sung by British musician and voice of the much-loved children's character Postman Pat, Ken Barrie.

References

External links
 
 
 
 
 Review of film at New York Times
 Sharks' Treasure at Letterbox DVD
 Sharks' Treasure at BFI

1975 films
Films directed by Cornel Wilde
United Artists films
1970s adventure films
Films set in Honduras
Films set in the Caribbean
Films scored by Robert O. Ragland
Treasure hunt films
Underwater action films
1970s English-language films